The 1927 Springfield Red and White football team was an American football team that represented Springfield College as an independent during the 1927 college football season. Led by fourth-year head coach John L. Rothacher, Springfield compiled a record of 7–0–2.

Schedule

References

Springfield
Springfield Pride football seasons
College football undefeated seasons
Springfield Red and White football